Luo Shih-feng or Daniel Lo (born 22 July 1968) is a Taiwanese singer, songwriter and television host. 

He was born in Miaoli County and is of Hakka descent. Luo performs Hokkien pop and Mandopop, and received a Golden Bell Award in 1997, followed by a Golden Melody Award in 2001.

References

External links

1968 births
Living people
Taiwanese male singers
People from Miaoli County
Taiwanese people of Hakka descent
Taiwanese Mandopop singers
Taiwanese Hokkien pop singers